James Logan (24 June 1870 – 25 May 1896) was a Scottish professional footballer. He was most famous for scoring a hat-trick in the 1894 FA Cup Final for Notts County in a 4–1 victory over Bolton Wanderers.

Playing career
Logan started his career at Ayr. On 21 March 1891, he scored on his full Scotland debut, finishing on the winning team in a 4–3 victory over Wales. He came to the attention of Sunderland that day and in 1891 signed for them, making two appearances as Sunderland won the 1891/1892 season.

In October 1892 he returned to Ayr F.C. briefly before signing for Aston Villa for a transfer fee of £30. He played ten times for them in the 1892/1893 season, scoring on seven occasions, and followed that up with one goal in four games before Notts County signed him. Notts County at this point were a Second Division Club, but this only helped Logan as he went on to score 21 goals in 21 games, guiding the club to their second FA Cup Final. Notts County eliminated three clubs from the First Division to reach the final and beat Bolton Wanderers 4–1, Jimmy Logan scoring a hat-trick to seal the victory.

Logan moved on to play two games for Dundee and later Newcastle United, scoring eight goals in the nine games, before transferring to Loughborough. It was here than his career ended. Loughborough on their way to play Newton Heath discovered that their kit had been lost. Unable to borrow any shirts, Loughborough had to take to the field wearing their ordinary clothes. Rain fell heavily throughout the 90 minutes, and at the end of a 0–2 defeat, Loughborough's players had to return home wearing the very clothes they had played the match in. Logan caught a cold, which he managed to shake off, but not long after scoring in a 4–1 victory in the final game of the season against Crewe Alexandra, Logan relapsed, developed pneumonia and died, aged 25.

Honours
Notts County
FA Cup winners: 1894

External links
1894 FA Cup Final
Jimmy Logan
Scotland profile
Footballs Fallen

References 

1870 births
1896 deaths
Scottish footballers
Scotland international footballers
Sunderland A.F.C. players
Aston Villa F.C. players
Notts County F.C. players
Dundee F.C. players
Newcastle United F.C. players
People from Troon
Ayr F.C. players
Loughborough F.C. players
English Football League players
Deaths from pneumonia in England
Association footballers not categorized by position
Footballers from South Ayrshire
FA Cup Final players